Nomi Jean Cater, better known as Nominjin, is a multi-lingual and multi-cultural singer and songwriter. She has performed in more than 15 countries as a solo singer in front of audiences of up to 70,000 people, on the prestigious stages such as Stern Auditorium of Carnegie Hall, David Geffen Hall of Lincoln Center and Welsh National Opera Orchestra at Llangollen. She speaks four languages and sings in 15 languages (English, Russian, Hindi, French, Korean, Chinese, Hebrew, Japanese, Spanish, Vietnamese etc.)

Early life
Raised by her American father and Mongolian mother, she resides in Los Angeles and has spent her early childhood in Russia, Mongolia, India, and the Caribbean due to her parents' work; as a result, she speaks fluent English and Mongolian and several other languages including Russian and Malayalam.

Career
Nominjin launched her career at age 14 after studying under vocal coach Roger Love. She has performed in Russia, the United States,UK ,Turkey, India, the Caribbean, Singapore, South Korea, France, Mexico, Japan, China, Hong Kong, Taiwan, and Thailand.

In addition to more than a dozen #1 hits in her native country of Mongolia, Nominjin's other accomplishments include being featured on John Lennon's tribute album Peace, Love & Truth. by Yoko Ono/EMI in 2005. In 2007, Nominjin's version of “Take Me To Your Heart” that she recorded with the National Morin Khuur Ensemble of Mongolia was included on the EMI album “Love: Best of Ten Years” alongside multi-platinum selling artists such as Christina Aguilera, Toni Braxton, Norah Jones and Ricky Martin.

Nominjin has performed alongside such global greats as Kenny Endo (soundtrack of Apocalypse Now) Shoji (Grammy nominated 2010),  and Rupert Hine (producer of Tina Turner,  Duncan Sheik and many others). Nominjin has studied under world-renowned vocal coaches Roger Love (2003–2008), Khongorzul (2009) and Paulette McWilliams (2010).

Nominjin has been a featured singer and sometimes host of major performances in 13 countries, including a 50,000 person peace festival at the Ajinomoto Stadium in Tokyo, Japan, co-hosting and performing for an international conference of 30,000 in Thailand, co-hosting and featured singer for an 80,000 person concert in Ulaanbaatar Mongolia and co-hosting a MTV show.

In April 2014, two-time Grammy-winning composer Christopher Tin, invited Nominjin to perform at Carnegie Hall's Stern Auditorium as a soloist in five languages (Mongolian, Japanese, Chinese, Persian, and Sanskrit) with a 600-person choir and 300 person orchestra. New York concert reviewers praised Nominjin for her soulful voice and passionate performance. Tin's album, A Drop That Contained The Sea, which Nominjin was a part of with her original Mongolian poem “Tsas Narand Uyarna” debuted at #1 on Billboard Classical charts in May, 2014.

In April 2016, two-time Grammy-winning composer Christopher Tin invited Nominjin to perform at Lincoln Center's David Geffen Hall as a soloist in 4 languages (Japanese, Chinese, Persian, and Sanskrit) with a 600-person choir and 300 person orchestra. New York concert reviewers again praised Nominjin for her passionate performance. The concert received a four-minute standing ovation.

In the summer of 2017, Nominjin was a headline performer at the Gala Concert of the 70th Anniversary of the Llangollen International Musical Eistedfodd. Nominjin joined Grammy winning composer Christopher Tin, the national Welsh National Opera Orchestra  and a mass choir made up of singers from Wales, South Africa, Taiwan, and the United States. The concert was filmed and subsequently broadcast on Welsh television station S4C and the BBC.

Other ventures

Actress
Nominjin was the lead actress of the play Heart Piece by Rubén Polendo, Theater Mitu of New York in December 2012.

Motivational speaker
Nominjin is as an inspiring youth role-model, having led an intoxicant free life-style her entire life. A motivational public speaker since age 14, her invites to speak publicly include the National University of Mongolia where she addressed students and faculty on healthy compassionate living as well as countless television, radio and newspaper interviews in Mongolia.

Sportscaster
Nominjin's accomplishments include working as the official English language sports caster, English language script writer, host and performer for both the opening and closing ceremonies of FILA World Cup 2013 held in Ulaanbaatar, Mongolia. She sang in eight languages for the top eight countries that gathered in Mongolia to compete for the World Cup which included Canada, China, United States of America, India, Japan, Mongolia and Belarus. She was highly praised by the international participants and Mongolian Ministry of Culture, Sports and Tourism for her contribution to this event.

Ambassador-at-large
In May 2013, The President of Mongolia's Chief of Staff and the Minister of Culture, Sport and Tourism travelled to New York to receive the 70 million year old dinosaur fossil which was illegally taken out of the country. This event was jointly organized by the governments of Mongolia and the United States of America. Nominjin was invited to host and sing at the reception and receiving ceremony which was held at the United Nation's headquarter building. Nominjin developed the script and hosted the award ceremony rewarding several American citizens with The Order of the Polar Star, the highest Presidential award given to foreign nationals.

Goodwill envoy
On May 23, 2015, Nominjin was appointed as a Goodwill Envoy for Public Diplomacy by Yun Byung-se, the Minister of Foreign Affairs of Republic of Korea, for the term of two years.

Luna Blanca
At the age of 17, Nominjin established Mongolia's premiere and number one non-profit vegan restaurant Luna Blanca, which consistently ranks #1-5 on international travel website TripAdvisor among Mongolia's 284 restaurants and on the travel book, Lonely Planet.

YouCAN.us
As a linguist, Nominjin's most recent endeavor has successfully launched in Mongolia on April 1, 2015. Together with her parents, she has developed YouCAN.us the first online English language teaching platform, with Mongolian explanations which made English language learning accessible and affordable to people of all economic backgrounds. Her mother is a former National University professor and a social worker, and her father is an international development senior advisor. Currently, YouCAN.us is in partnership with the Mongolian University of Science and Technology, where Nominjin and her parents are training the Power Engineering teaching staff, with a blended professional English learning program designed for power engineering faculty and students. In 2022, the platform began promoting wellness and guided meditation courses.

Personal life

Veganism and animal rights
Since launching her music career at age 13, Nominjin has been a pioneer in promoting a healthy lifestyle in her home country. She is a yoga/meditation practitioner and a vegan since a young age.

She was selected as one of PETA's sexiest vegetarian celebrities and has done numerous campaigns promoting compassionate lifestyle. Nominjin has worked with PETA with many international pro-vegan and anti-fur ad campaigns. In 2020, Nominjin supported PETA's international campaign against cashmere cruelty.

The multi-awarding winning documentary "Eating our Way to Extinction" featured Nominjin as their narrator on the version released to the Mongolian market.

References

Further reading

1989 births
Living people
21st-century Mongolian women singers
Mongolian expatriates in India
Mongolian expatriates in the United States